Richard Joseph "Rick" Sanders (January 20, 1945 – October 18, 1972) was an American folkstyle and freestyle wrestler. He won gold medals at the 1967 Pan American Games and 1969 World Championships, finishing second at the 1968 and 1972 Olympics and 1967 World Championships. After the 1972 Olympics, while traveling to Greece, he was killed in a car accident in Skopje, Yugoslavia.

Wrestling

High school
Rick Sanders attended Lincoln High School in Portland, Oregon. While there he wrestled at 98 pounds in 1961, 108 pounds in 1962 and 115 pounds in 1963. He won three Oregon State Championships, finishing with a high school record of 80–1.

University
When Sanders arrived at Portland State University, he quickly led his team to national prominence. As a freshman, he highlighted an undefeated season by winning the 1965 NAIA National Championships at 115 pounds and earned the Outstanding Wrestler Award. As a sophomore Sanders lost the first match of his career when he moved up to the 123 pound class and placed third in the NCAA College Division Nationals. Two weeks later he dropped down to the 115 pound class and won the 1966 NCAA University Division National Championship. As a junior Sanders had a perfect season going undefeated and winning both the 1967 NCAA College and University Division National Championships at 115 pounds. He was selected as the Outstanding Wrestler in both meets. As a senior Sanders moved up to the 123 pound class and went undefeated during the regular season. He won his second NCAA College Division National Championship and was again selected as the Outstanding Wrestler. Two weeks later at the NCAA University Division Nationals, Sanders lost for only the second time in his collegiate career when he placed second. His total collegiate record was 103–2. He led his Portland State team to a first-place finish in the 1967 NCAA College Division Nationals, a second-place finish in 1968, and a third-place finish in 1967. The same three years Portland State also finished fifth, sixth, and eighth in the NCAA University Division Nationals. Sanders is the only collegiate wrestler to win National Championships in the NAIA, NCAA College Division, and the NCAA University Division, and be designated an Outstanding Wrestler in each.

U.S. Team and Olympics
As early as his freshman year in college, in 1965, Sanders won his first of five national freestyle championships and made the U.S. World Team. In 1966 he placed third in the World Championships, in 1967 he placed second in the World, and won the Pan American Games. In 1968, Sanders won an Olympic silver medal. A year later, at 114.5 pounds, Sanders became the first American ever to win a World Championship. He returned to the Olympics in 1972 and captured another silver medal. Of the eleven bouts he won in two Olympics, nine came by fall.

Death
Following the Olympic Games in Munich, Sanders began touring Europe. While hitch-hiking to Greece, he was killed in an automobile accident on October 18, 1972 in Skopje, Yugoslavia when the Land Rover he was riding in crashed head-on into a bus. He is buried in Forrester Cemetery, Eagle Creek, Oregon.

References

1945 births
1972 deaths
Wrestlers at the 1968 Summer Olympics
Wrestlers at the 1972 Summer Olympics
American male sport wrestlers
Olympic silver medalists for the United States in wrestling
Wrestlers from Oregon
Lincoln High School (Portland, Oregon) alumni
Road incident deaths in North Macedonia
Road incident deaths in Yugoslavia
Portland State Vikings wrestlers
World Wrestling Championships medalists
Medalists at the 1972 Summer Olympics
Medalists at the 1968 Summer Olympics
Pan American Games gold medalists for the United States
Pan American Games medalists in wrestling
Wrestlers at the 1967 Pan American Games
Medalists at the 1967 Pan American Games